Mariinsky Posad (Sĕntĕrvărri) is a town and the administrative center of Mariinsko-Posadsky District in the Chuvash Republic, Russia, located on the right bank of the Volga River,  east of Cheboksary, the capital of the republic. As of the 2010 Census, its population was 9,088.

History
It was first mentioned in 1620 as the selo of Sundyr, named after the Sundyrka River (a tributary of the Volga). It was granted town status and renamed Mariinsky Posad after Empress consort Maria Alexandrovna in 1856.

Administrative and municipal status
Within the framework of administrative divisions, Mariinsky Posad serves as the administrative center of Mariinsko-Posadsky District. As an administrative division, it is incorporated within Mariinsko-Posadsky District as Mariinsko-Posadskoye Urban Settlement. As a municipal division, this administrative unit also has urban settlement status and is a part of Mariinsko-Posadsky Municipal District.

Economy
There are eleven processing, mechanical engineering, and construction materials factories in the town. Some of the other industries of employment in the city are a plant of cable works, a large automobile-repairing industry, a distillery, and a cooking oil-producing plant.

Nature

The area around the town has rich wildlife. There are several national parks and reservations nearby. The area is a popular ecotourism destination.

Education
The town has several schools.

References

Notes

Sources

Cities and towns in Chuvashia
Cheboksarsky Uyezd
Populated places on the Volga